Simon Wilson or Willson may refer to:

Sports
Simon Wilson (cricketer) (born 1970), New Zealand cricketer
Simon Wilson (fencer) (born 1958), Paralympic fencer and Team GB coach at the 2012 Summer Paralympics
Simon Wilson (ice hockey) (born 1976), New Zealand ice hockey player and coach 
Simon Wilson (cyclist) (born 1980), in 2011 British National Track Championships
Simon Wilson (hurler), Irish hurler
Simon Wilson (equestrian), New Zealand equestrian

Others
Simon Wilson (actor), British actor
Simon Wilson (producer), a producer for the BBC series Kröd Mändoon and the Flaming Sword of Fire
Simon Wilson (editor), New Zealand editor, writer, and political analyst for the newspaper NZ Herald and formerly the magazine Metro
Simon Willson, Hong Kong radio producer/personality